Jay Fletcher Vincent (born June 10, 1959) is an American former professional basketball player. He played college basketball for the Michigan State Spartans. Vincent was selected 24th overall by the Dallas Mavericks in the 1981 NBA draft. He played for several NBA teams, including the Dallas Mavericks, Washington Bullets, Denver Nuggets, San Antonio Spurs, Philadelphia 76ers, and Los Angeles Lakers. Vincent also played professionally in Italy.

College
A 6'7" forward, Vincent played at Michigan State University under coach, Jud Heathcote, where he teamed with Magic Johnson and Greg Kelser to win the 1979 NCAA Men's Division I Basketball Tournament. Vincent won the Big Ten scoring championship in his junior and senior years.

Professional career
He was then selected by the Dallas Mavericks in the second round of the 1981 NBA draft (24th overall pick), and he went on to have a productive 9-year NBA career, playing for the Mavericks (1981–86), Washington Bullets (1986–87), Denver Nuggets (1987–89), San Antonio Spurs (1989), Philadelphia 76ers (1989–1990) and Los Angeles Lakers (1990).  He concluded his NBA career in 1990 with 8,729 career points, 3,167 career rebounds, and 1,124 career assists.

Personal life
Vincent is the older brother of seven-year NBA player and former NBA coach Sam Vincent.

In August 2010 it was revealed that an East Lansing, Michigan, company owned by Vincent was involved in a scam that defrauded about 20,000 people across the United States out of more than $2 million. On August 18, 2010, Vincent and another man were indicted by a federal grand jury on mail fraud charges stemming from conduct between 2006 and 2009. Vincent later pleaded guilty. In July 2011 he voluntarily revoked his bond and was jailed ahead of his September 2011 sentencing. He was sentenced to five and a half years in prison on September 2, 2011.
Upon being released in March 2016, he worked as a manager at a Battle Creek, Michigan, based restaurant called Juicy Burger until his release from parole in July 2016.

References

External links
 Career statistics

1959 births
Living people
African-American basketball players
All-American college men's basketball players
American expatriate basketball people in Italy
American men's basketball players
American people convicted of fraud
American sportspeople convicted of crimes
Auxilium Pallacanestro Torino players
Basketball players from Michigan
Dallas Mavericks draft picks
Dallas Mavericks players
Denver Nuggets players
Libertas Liburnia Basket Livorno players
Los Angeles Lakers players
Michigan State Spartans men's basketball players
Philadelphia 76ers players
Power forwards (basketball)
San Antonio Spurs players
Small forwards
Sportspeople from Kalamazoo, Michigan
Washington Bullets players
21st-century African-American people
20th-century African-American sportspeople